Alai (also Romanized as Ālā’ī) is a village in Surak Rural District, Lirdaf District, Jask County, Hormozgan Province, Iran. At the 2006 census, its population was 41, in 10 families.

References 

Populated places in Jask County